Giacomo de Angelis (1610–1695) was a Roman Catholic cardinal.

Biography
On 3 Oct 1660, he was consecrated bishop Giulio Cesare Sacchetti, Cardinal-Bishop of Sabina.

Episcopal succession
While bishop, he was the principal consecrator of:

He also presided over the priestly ordination of St. Giuseppe Maria Tomasi di Lampedusa, (1673).

References

1610 births
1695 deaths
17th-century Italian cardinals
17th-century Italian Roman Catholic archbishops